Wiseman is a small unincorporated community situated along the Strawberry River in the northeast corner of Izard County, Arkansas, United States.

It is within the Izard County Consolidated School District. It was previously in the Violet Hill school district. In 1985 that district consolidated into Izard Consolidated.

References

Unincorporated communities in Izard County, Arkansas
Unincorporated communities in Arkansas